Michael Leslie Peters  (born 25 February 1959) is a Welsh musician, best known as the lead singer of The Alarm. After the band split up in 1991, Peters wrote and released solo work, before reconstituting The Alarm in 2000. Additionally, he is co-founder of the Love Hope Strength Foundation. Between 2011 and 2013, Peters was the vocalist for Big Country as well as The Alarm.

Early life
Peters was born in Prestatyn and grew up living in The Crescent Hotel in Edward Henry Street, Rhyl, with former The Alarm band member Eddie MacDonald. The name of the street became the inspiration for a track on the album of the same name, released as part of The Poppyfields Bond of albums. On "Edward Henry Street", Peters describes his life growing up in Wales.

Peters' first job was a computer operator for Kwik Save. He worked on an old IBM System 3 mainframe.

Musical career

1970s
Peters' musical debut was on 10 October 1975, when he fronted Hairy Hippie (named by the disc jockey James Alexander Barr), a band formed with his schoolmates to perform at his sister's 21st birthday party at the Talardy Hotel in St Asaph. The first song performed that night was a cover version of "If You Think You Know How To Love Me" by Smokie.

His first band proper was the Toilets, formed after he saw the Sex Pistols play at Chester in 1976. The first song the Toilets played live was "Nothing to Do" at the Palace Hotel in Rhyl.

Peters, along with MacDonald, Dave Sharp and Nigel Twist (then called Nigel Buckle), formed a band called Seventeen in 1978. The first song Seventeen played was "Pop Generation" at the Bee (now Station) Hotel in Rhyl on 27 May 1978. One single was released in 1979 on the Vendetta label titled "Don't Let Go".

1980s
In 1981, The Alarm was formed and moved to London to tour the club circuit. They were signed by the IRS label. The band took their name from a song named Alarm Alarm, that was one of the first songs written by Peters for the Toilets. On BBC Radio 1, John Peel commented that with Duran Duran, Talk Talk and now Alarm Alarm perhaps he should call himself John Peel John Peel, so the name was shortened to The Alarm.

The Alarm played their first gig in the Victoria Hotel in Prestatyn on 10 June 1981. "Shout to the Devil" was the first song to be played. Peters wrote the song that day and as it suited the three acoustics and drumkit line-up, the band used to rehearse it during the soundcheck. Their first single on their own label, "Unsafe Building", was released in November 1981.

1990s
In 1991, The Alarm split up after Peters left the band on stage at the Brixton Academy.

The original members of the Alarm have only reunited once. This was for the VH1 series Bands Reunited on 28 October 2003.

Two singles were released in 1994. "Back into the System", which also included a Welsh release of the single. This was followed by "It Just Don't Get Any Better Than This". Peters teamed up with the Poets for both records. The single also included a first release of the track "White Noise" which Peters re-recorded for the album Rise. The American release also included a re-mix.

It would be a further year before Peters released his first solo album venture Breathe. Being a UK-only release, the CD version of the album did not contain Peter's first two solo singles. An acoustic-only version of the same album was also released. By now, Peters had retreated into the internet and had his own website, where most of his future releases would be sold.

After having been diagnosed with cancer in 1995, Peters released his second solo venture Feel Free. The album included a take on Grandmaster Flash's influential rap track "The Message". The American release of Feel Free also included a special hidden track called "Gone Elvis".

In 1998, Rise was released, to a wider audience this time. Rise was a change of musical direction for Peters. "White Noise Part II" found Peters experimenting with studio sound manipulation and drum machines, whereas "My Calling" featured Peters' signature acoustic/electric roots-rock sound. The album also featured the song "In Circles", which Peters co-wrote with ex-Cult guitarist Billy Duffy.

Peters followed the release of Rise by touring the US under "The Interactive Acoustic Works U.S. Tour", which started in Boston on 10 October 1998. That year also saw the release of the album Live (From a Broadcast). This set included a version of the Alarm's best known song, "68 Guns", which reinstated an extra verse that the band had trimmed out early in the writing process.

In 1999, Peters again worked with Billy Duffy, forming a band called Coloursound with Duffy, his former Cult bandmate Scott Garret, and Craig Adams (formerly of The Mission). They recorded one eponymous studio album.

Since 1993, Peters has held an annual weekend event called "The Gathering" at Llandudno. It has been attended by various guest musicians, including former Alarm band members.

2000s
The new millennium saw Peters release Flesh and Blood, based on the stage play of the same name written by Helen Griffin.

In 2000, Peters decided to reuse the Alarm brand name. After he left the band in 1991, Peters had signed over rights to the name to the other band members. This caused former drummer Nigel Twist to threaten to sue. Peters has since used the Alarm brand name, sometimes with added roman numerals for the year.

In 2001, Peters went on the road again as part of supergroup Dead Men Walking. Featuring Pete Wylie (of The Mighty Wah!), Glen Matlock (former Sex Pistols), Captain Sensible (The Damned), and Kirk Brandon (Spear of Destiny), the band played a mixture of old and new material spanning their combined careers.

In 2004, Peters released the single "45 RPM" using the pseudonym, the Poppy Fields, using the guise that this band was a teenage band based from Chester. (This hoax was the source of the subject of the movie Vinyl). Peters came eleventh in an on-line poll to find 100 Welsh Heroes.

He joined members of The Mescaleros in 2010 to perform songs of Joe Strummer under the name Los Mondo Bongo.

In 2011, Peters joined Big Country for their UK tour and released a single with the band that August, titled "Another Country", followed in April 2013 by an album The Journey. On 9 November 2013 it was announced via the Big Country Facebook page that Peters had departed the band.

Musical influences
Peters has stated various artists have had an influence on his musical direction. In "Edward Henry Street" of the album with the same name Peters sings "bought Aladdin Sane from Greaves records" in reference to the song by David Bowie.

Woody Guthrie is also an influence.

MPO
MPO (Mike Peters Organisation) was formed in 1992 as Peters used the internet to communicate with his fan base.

Health and personal life
In 1986, in the middle of the height of the fame of The Alarm, whilst based in London during the week, Peters was still living with his parents in Rhyl. Having hitch-hiked home one weekend, he met his future wife, Jules, then an undergraduate student at Bangor University studying English. The couple were engaged two weeks later, and have two sons, both conceived through IVF. The family currently lives in Dyserth, North Wales.

In 1996, Peters made a recovery from lymph cancer, and began recording and touring again, sometimes with members of the re-formed band. He also presented a regular show called Bedrock on BBC Radio Wales.  In 2005, Peters discovered that he was suffering from chronic lymphocytic leukaemia. At this time, Peters co-founded the Love Hope Strength Foundation with fellow leukaemia patient James Chippendale, the president of CSI Entertainment in Dallas, Texas. Peters has since announced a remission of this and has appeared in a documentary for BBC Wales chronicling his battle with cancer. The documentary was released in 2006 as Mike Peters on the Road to Recovery with some of the proceeds being donated to Peters' foundation.

In October 2007, Peters, along with 38 other musicians, cancer survivors and supporters, made a 14-day trek to the Mount Everest base camp to perform the highest concert ever on land to raise awareness and money to fight cancer. Other musicians included Cy Curnin and Jamie West-Oram of The Fixx, Glenn Tilbrook of Squeeze, Slim Jim Phantom of The Stray Cats and Nick Harper. In 2011, Love Hope Strength Foundation released the film More to Live For, intended to promote the importance of bone marrow donation in saving the lives of cancer victims.

Peters is a regular member of the running group The NightCrawlers, who run every Thursday night around various locations in the North East Wales area.

Peters was appointed Deputy Lieutenant of Clwyd in December 2008. He was appointed a Member of the Most Excellent Order of the British Empire (MBE) in the 2019 New Year Honours for services to cancer care.

In September 2022, he announced that his chronic lymphocytic leukaemia (CLL) had relapsed, and he was being treated with chemotherapy at the North Wales Cancer Centre.

Discography

Albums

Singles

Promotional recordings

Filmography

Videos

DVDS

References

External links
Official Alarm website

1959 births
Living people
Welsh male singers
Welsh rock guitarists
Welsh songwriters
Welsh new wave musicians
Male new wave singers
People from Prestatyn
People from Rhyl
The Alarm members
Big Country members
Members of the Order of the British Empire
Dead Men Walking members
British male songwriters
Deputy Lieutenants of Clwyd